Anna Raymond Massey  (11 August 19373 July 2011) was an English actress. She won a BAFTA Award for the role of Edith Hope in the 1986 TV adaptation of Anita Brookner's novel Hotel du Lac, a role that one of her co-stars, Julia McKenzie, has said "could have been written for her". Massey is best known for her role as Babs Milligan in Alfred Hitchcock's 1972 film, Frenzy.

Early life
Massey was born in Thakeham, Sussex, England, the daughter of British actress Adrianne Allen and Canadian-born Hollywood actor Raymond Massey. Her brother Daniel Massey was also an actor. She was the niece of Vincent Massey, a Governor General of Canada, and her godfather was film director John Ford.

Career
Although she had no formal training at either drama school or in repertory, Anna Massey made her first appearance on stage in May 1955 at the age of 17, at the Theatre Royal, Brighton, as Jane in The Reluctant Debutante, subsequently making her first London appearance in the same play at the Cambridge Theatre in May 1955 "and was suddenly famous". She then left the cast in London to repeat her performance in New York in October 1956. In the 1990s she appeared with Alan Bennett in a dramatised reading of T.S. Eliot's and Virginia Woolf's letters, in a production at the Charleston Festival devised by Patrick Garland.

Several of her early film roles were in mystery thrillers. She made her cinema debut in the Scotland Yard film Gideon's Day (1958) as Sally, daughter of Jack Hawkins's Detective Inspector. The director was her godfather John Ford. She played a potential murder victim in Michael Powell's cult thriller Peeping Tom (1960) and appeared in Otto Preminger's Bunny Lake Is Missing (1965). In 1972 she played the role of the barmaid Babs in Alfred Hitchcock's penultimate film Frenzy. In the documentary on the film's DVD release, Massey mentioned that she originally auditioned for the much smaller role of the secretary Monica, a part for which Jean Marsh was cast. She also noted that her character's nude scenes in Frenzy were performed by body doubles. She appeared alongside her brother Daniel—they played siblings—in the horror film The Vault of Horror (1973).

Massey continued to make occasional film and stage appearances, but worked more frequently in television. She made her first small-screen appearance as Jacqueline in Green of the Year in October 1955, and thereafter featured in dramas such as The Pallisers (1974),  The Mayor of Casterbridge (1978), the 1979 adaptation of Rebecca (in which she starred with her ex-husband Jeremy Brett), The Cherry Orchard (1980), and Anna Karenina (1985). She had roles in the British comedy series The Darling Buds of May (1991) and The Robinsons (2005). She also appeared in a number of mysteries and thrillers on television, including episodes of Inspector Morse, The Inspector Alleyn Mysteries, Midsomer Murders, Strange, Lewis, and Agatha Christie's Poirot.

With Imelda Staunton, she co-devised and starred as Josephine Daunt in Daunt and Dervish on BBC radio. She was the narrator of This Sceptred Isle on BBC Radio 4, a history of Britain from Roman times which ran for more than 300 fifteen-minute episodes. In 2009, she also appeared in a new radio version of The Killing of Sister George.

In 1987, Massey was awarded the BAFTA Award for Best Actress for her role in Hotel du Lac after acquiring the TV rights two years earlier, only a few weeks before the novel won the Booker Prize. She also appeared as Mrs D'Urberville in the 2008 BBC adaptation of Tess of the D'Urbervilles.

Acting style
One of Massey's assets as an actress was her "extraordinary voice... it was so listenable". Although Massey's parts were varied, her "cut-glass English accent conveyed a cold and repressed character on screen". Michael Billington of The Guardian characterised her work as being informed by "stillness", such as in the National Theatre's production of Harold Pinter's A Kind of Alaska.

She was known for a high level of preparation and effort, with one producer saying that she had a practice of using five different coloured pens on scripts to mark out "breaths and pauses" and the development of a scene; for example, "if a phrase early in a paragraph was going to be picked up again later, she would highlight those two bits in the same colour, so that it would remind her that that first phrase was referring to something later".

Personal life
In the New Year's Honours List published on 31 December 2004, she was created a Commander of the Order of the British Empire (CBE) for services to drama.

Massey published an autobiography in 2006, Telling Some Tales, in which she revealed a difficult early life and discussed her failed marriage (1958–1962) to actor Jeremy Brett, discussing his struggle with bipolar disorder. Brett and Massey divorced on 22 November 1962 after she claimed he left her for a man. The couple had one son, writer and illustrator David Huggins (b. 1959). At an August 1988 dinner party held at the home of their mutual friend, Joy Whitby, she met Russian-born metallurgist Uri Andres, who had been based at Imperial College, London since 1975. The couple were married from November 1988 until her death in 2011.

Massey was quoted as saying, "Theatre eats up too much of your family life. I have a grandson and a husband and I'd rather I was able to be a granny and a wife".

She died from lung cancer in Kensington, London on 3 July 2011, aged 73.

Selected TV and filmography

Books

See also
Massey family

References

External links

Stage performances in Theatre Archive University of Bristol

 Obituary in The Independent
 Obituary in The Telegraph

1937 births
2011 deaths
Anna Massey
Best Actress BAFTA Award (television) winners
Deaths from cancer in England
Commanders of the Order of the British Empire
English film actresses
English radio actresses
English television actresses
English people of Canadian descent
People from Thakeham
Actresses from Sussex
20th-century British businesspeople